Ajuga boninsimae is a herbaceous flowering plant native to the Bonin Islands of Japan. It was first described in 1888.

Description

Ajuga boninsimae reaches a height of 20 to 30 cm. It produces small white flowers between December and March. It appears about the edges and glades of mountainous forests. It has been described as rare.

References

boninsimae
Garden plants of Asia
Groundcovers